Geoffrey D. Calhoun is an American screenwriter, author and narrator. He is known for writing The Guide for Every Screenwriter (2019) and for co-writing various films.

Career 
Originally from Troy, Michigan, Calhoun worked as an MRI technician prior to becoming a screenwriter. He wrote his first script after being challenged to write a screenplay by a friend of his who worked in the television industry. After writing the neo-noir thriller Pink Bunny, which was later optioned, Calhoun decided to begin screenwriting fulltime. He subsequently studied screenwriting at the Film Connection.

Filmmaking 
Calhoun co-wrote the drama film Sirens of Chrome, a documentary about the roles of models and female presenters at auto shows which featured Jeff Lemke and Lauren Fix. The film was based on Margery Krevsky's book of the same name.

In 2019, he co-wrote the horror script Resurrected with JoAnn Hess. Calhoun and Hess later co-wrote the script for the romantic comedy film Confectionately, Yours, which won Best Comedy-Romantic Feature at the 2020 Indie Gathering Film Festival.

He co-wrote the biographical drama Finding Nicole, starring Kaiti Wallen, John Savage, Brandon Quintin Adams and Kelli Maroney. The film, which is based on co-writer Nicole Beverly's experiences as a domestic abuse survivor, was directed by Harley Wallen.

Calhoun co-wrote the upcoming horror film SOS, starring Vernon Wells, Jenabah Koroma and Rachel Faulkner. He also played the role of Yuri in the 2021 crime film Trick, starring Eugenia Kuzmina, Robert Pralgo and Oksana Maria.

Calhoun has collaborated with filmmaker Darcy Weir on numerous projects. Calhoun was a script consultant for Weir's 2020 documentary film Sasquatch Among Wildmen. He also wrote Weir's 2020 documentary series Occult Journeys, and was head writer and narrator of Weir's 2021 documentary film Crop Circle Realities.

The Guide for Every Screenwriter 
Calhoun wrote The Guide for Every Screenwriter, a screenwriting manual published in 2019. The book explores the screenwriting process, and outlines various methods of storytelling and narrative.

Other work 
Calhoun founded WeFixYourScript, a script doctoring and consultation company, which has worked with filmmakers such as Jay Mohr. Calhoun is also the director of Script Summit, an annual screenwriting contest. He hosts the Successful Screenwriter podcast, and has written for publications such as Script Magazine.

Awards and nominations 
Calhoun won the Louis Mitchell Award for Excellence in Writing at the 2017 Action On Film International Film Festival, and he was nominated for Best New Writer at the 2016 Action on Film Festival. His comedy horror Hipster-Z was nominated for Best Comedy Feature at the 2016 Action on Film Festival. Hipster-Z also won Best Feature Horror Comedy in the 2016 Horror Hotel International Film Festival. Hipster-Z also won Best Feature Comedy Script in the 2017 Indie Gathering Film Festival.

Filmography

Films

Television

References

External links 
 

American screenwriters
People from Troy, Michigan
Writers from Michigan
Year of birth missing (living people)
Living people